Guagua longganisa, also known as Candaba longganisa, is a Filipino pork sausage originating from the towns of Guagua and Candaba, Pampanga. It is a type of de recado longganisa characterized by its salty and sour taste because of its heavier use of vinegar in comparison to other Filipino sausages.

See also
Pampanga longganisa, a sweet longganisa also from Pampanga
 List of sausages

References

Philippine sausages